Ashulia is a suburban area near Dhaka, the capital city of Bangladesh. Nearby areas are Savar, Savar DOHS, and Tongi. The attractive view of Ashulia lake and vast paddy fields of Ashulia makes it a popular tourist spot. Two major theme parks of Bangladesh namely Fantasy Kingdom and Nandan Park are also located at Ashulia. A thana (political subdivision) under Dhaka district has been established here in the recent years.

Environmentalists and some non-governmental organizations in Bangladesh have expressed concern over rapid urbanization of Ashulia specially in the context of ongoing real estate development projects in the area. The most affected city around Dhaka is now Ashulia. Most of  Ashulia is now owned by the garment factory or land developers. In recent years, it has lost most of its farmland because of the bricks field business.

References

Populated places in Dhaka Division